Ali Shojaei (born 27 January 1997) is an Iranian professional football player who plays as a winger for Persian Gulf Pro League club Nassaji.

Club career

Saipa
He started his career with Saipa youth levels. He promoted to first team by Majid Jalali in winter 2015 and made his debut for Saipa in on October 19, 2015, against Tractor Sazi as a substitute for Ali Zeynali.

Persepolis 
On 8 September 2020, Shojaei signed a two-year contract with Persian Gulf Pro League champions Persepolis.

Return to  Nassaji Mazandaran 
on 23 June 2022, Shojaei joined Nassaji on a new one-year deal.

Club career statistics

Honours

Club

Persepolis
Persian Gulf Pro League (1): 2020–21
Iranian Super Cup (1): 2020 ; Runner-up (1): 2021
AFC Champions League Runner-up (1): 2020

References

External links

 
 Ali Shojaei at eurosport
 
 
 Ali Shojaei at Fmdataba
 

Living people
Iranian footballers
Nassaji Mazandaran players
Saipa F.C. players
1997 births
Iran under-20 international footballers
Sportspeople from Tehran
Association football forwards
Persepolis F.C. players